Carnelian (or Cornell red) is a color named after the carnelian variety of the mineral chalcedony. This semi-precious gemstone is noted for its rich shade of reddish-brown.

The first recorded use of Carnelian as a color name in English was in 1899. Cornell's color is referred to as Cornelian (an alternate spelling of the mineral carnelian) in the World Almanac of 1892 and the Living Church Annual and Whittaker's Churchman's Almanac of 1896.

Carnelian in culture

School colors
 The official school colors of Cornell University are carnelian and white.

Buildings
 The Carnelian Room was a luxury restaurant that was once located on the 52nd (top) floor of the 555 California Street Building, formerly the Bank of America Center, in San Francisco, California. The restaurant was so named because 555 California Street is a building whose outer cladding is composed of carnelian colored granite. The restaurant went out of business on 31 December 2009 because of the continuing impact of the financial crisis of 2007–2008. In 2013, the space the restaurant occupied was leased by video game company Supercell.

Business
 In 1898, Herberton Williams, a Campbell Soup Company executive, convinced the company to adopt a carnelian red and bright white color scheme, because he was taken by the crisp carnelian red color of the Cornell University football team's uniforms.

Sports
 Carnelian is the main color of the Los Angeles Angels of Anaheim Major League Baseball (MLB) franchise.

References

Shades of red